Bartholomew Township is a township in Drew County, Arkansas, United States. Its total population was 168 as of the 2010 United States Census, a decrease of 24.66 percent from 223 at the 2000 census.

According to the 2010 Census, Bartholomew Township is located at  (33.505775, -91.467687).

The town of Jerome is located within the township.

References

External links 

Townships in Arkansas
Populated places in Drew County, Arkansas